Adem Zaplluzha (1 February 1943 – 9 November 2020) was one of the most prolific Kosovan Albanian poets. He completed his primary and secondary education in his hometown, Prizren, and graduated from the School of Pedagogy at the University of Pristina. After that he worked as a teacher for a while in several villages near Prizren and then as a legal translator at the Kosovan Electricity Corporation after that until the end of his career. He started writing and publishing literature from his childhood with his first poem being published in 1957 in the Pionieri literary magazine. At the Kosovan Electricity Corporation he co-founded the literary club 'Kosovan Poppies' which later published some of his works most notably in the 'Ngjyra e Kohës' ('The colour of time') anthology. His works were published in a wide variety of literary and non-literary publications in Kosovo, Albania, Macedonia and Romania.

Awards 
In 2013 he was awarded the Lifetime Achievement Award by the Writers and Artists Club of Durrës, Albania.
In the same year the Albanian literary critic Fatmir Minguli published a collection of critical essays on his body of work in a book entitled "Revoltë dhe meditim mbi poetikën e Adem Zaplluzhes".
He was a member of the Kosovan Writers Society.

Some of his published works 
 "Puthje", poezi, "Rilindja", Prishtinë, 1974
 "Ecjet e viteve të mëdha", poezi, "Jeta e Re", Prishtinë 1995
 "Çamarrokët e Thepores", poezi për fëmijë, "Shkëndija",Prishtinë 1996
 "Muret", poezi, "Jeta e Re", Prishtinë, 1997
 "Morfologjia e dhembjes", poezi, "Faik Konica", Prishtinë, 2000
 "Ai vjen nesër", poezi, Qendra e Kulturës, Klubi letrar"Fahri Fazliu", Kastriot, 2007
 "Letër nga mërgimi", poezi, Klubi letrar "Fahri Fazliu"Kastriot , 2007
 "Letër nga mërgimi 2 " poezi, "Qendra e Kulturës", Klubi letrar, "Fahri Fazliu", Kastriot 2007
 "Udhëndarja", poezi, "Qendra e Kulturës", Klubi letrar, "Fahri Fazliu", Kastriot, 2008
 "Thirrje e gjakut", poezi,"Qendra e Kulturës", Klubi letrar, "Fahri Fazliu"Kastriot 2008
 "Asgjë sikur molla", poezi, "Qendra e Kulturës", Klubi letrar "Fahri Fazliu", Kastriot, 2009
 "Vesa në lotin tim", poezi, "Qendra e Kulturës", Klubi letrar "Fahri Fazliu", 2009,
 "Puthja e gozhduar", poezi, "Qendra e Kulturës", Klubi letrar, "Fahri Fazliu", Kastriot, 2009
 "Kashelasha në vargje", poezi për fëmijë," Qendra e kulturës, Kastriot, 2009
 "Pema e bekuar", E përkthyer, Rumani, 2010
 "Bajraktarët e vatanit", poezi satirike, Klubi letrar, "Fahri Fazliu" Kastriot, 2010
 "Hijet e ndryshkura", poezi,"Qendra e kulturës", Kastriot, 2010
 "Stuhi në Kutulishte", poezi,"Qendra e kulturës", Kastriot, 2010
 "Posa ikte nata", poezi, "Qendra e kulturës ", Kastriot, 2010
 "Loja e myshqeve", poezi,"Qendra e kulturës", Kastriot, 2010
 "Lumëbardhi dhe gjëma", poezi,"Qendra e kulturës",Kastriot, 2010
 "Metafora e heshtjes", poezi, "Qendra e kulturës",Kastriot, 2010
 "Hyji në Prekaz", poezi,"Qendra e Kulturës", Kastriot, 2010
 "Sinorët e hinores", poezi, Shoqata e Shkrimtarëve-Kastriot 2010
 "Don Kishoti dhe Rosinanti", poezi, Shoqata e Shkrimtarëve, Kastriot, 2010
 "Zjarri i dashurisë", poezi, Shoqata e Shkrimtarëve-Kastriot, 2010
 "Kur likenet vallëzojnë", poezi, Shoqata e shkrimtarëve-Kastriot, 2010
 "Ditari në vargje", poezi, Shoqata e Shkrimtarëve-Kastriot, 2010
 "Tingujt që nuk përfundojnë", poezi, Shoqata e shkrimtarëve –Kastriot, 2010
 "Shtegu i mallit", poezi, Shoqata e shkrimtarëve-Kastriot, 2010
 "Korniza e thyer"',Poezi, Shoqata e shkrimtarëve, -Kastriot, 2010
 "Zgjimi i gjëmës",Poezi, Shoqata e Shkrimtareve-Kastriot, 2010
 "Vallja mistike", Poezi, Shoqata e Shkrimtarëve- Kastriot, 2010
 "Merre kodin", Poezi për fëmijë, Shoqata e shkrimtarëve Kastriot, 2011
 "Letër atdheut" poezi, Shoqata e Shkrimtarëve-Kastriot, 2011
 "Tejdukshmëria e shiut", Poezi, Shoqata e Shkrimtarëve- Kastriot, 2011
 "Përtej teje",poezi, Shoqata e Shkrimtarëve-Kastriot, 2011
 "Sa afër e sa large", poezi, Shoqata e shkrimtarëve-Kastriot, 2011
 "Vallja e zanoreve", Poezi, Shoqata e Shkrimtarëve- Kastriot, 2011
 "Ikja e eshtrave", Poezi për të rritur, Shoqata e Shkrimtarëve- Kastriot, 2011
 "Kalorësit e mjegullave", Poezi, Shoqata e shkrimtarëve-Kastriot, 2012
 "Hingëllimat e shiut", Poezi, Shoqata e Shkrimtarëve- Kastriot 2012
 "Kur pemët i ndërrojnë këmishët". Poezi, Shoqata e Shkrimtarëve- Kastriot, 2012
 "Mirëmëngjes Imzot", Poezi, Shoqata e shkrimtarëve – Kastriot, 2012
 "Kafshimi i mikut", Poezi satirike, Shoqata e Shkrimtarëve- Kastriot, 2012
 "Atje tej maleve", Poezi, Shoqata e shkrimtarëve, Kastriot-2012
 "Heshtja që del në shesh," Poezi, Shoqata e Shkrimtarëve, Kastriot -2012
 "Portat e shpresës", Poezi, Shoqata e shkrimtarëve, Kastriot-2012
 "Në dhomën time gjysmë të errët", Poezi, Shoqata e Shkrimtarëve- Kastriot, 2012
 "Kinse Lojë Shahu", Poezi, Shoqata e Shkrimtarëve- Kastriot, 2012
 "Për çdo dekadë nga një baladë ", Poezi, Shoqata e Shkrimtarëve – Kastriot, 2012
 "Fusha e mëllenjave", Poezi, Shoqata e shkrimtarëve- Kastriot, 2012
 "E kujt është kjo vetmi", Poezi, Shoqate e Shkrimtarëve- Kastriot, 2012
 "Mos pyet për addressën e lumit", Poezi, Shoqata e Shkrimtarëve – Kastriot, 2012
 "Stoli në parkun vjetër" Poezi, Shoqata e Shkrimtarëve- Kastriot, 2012
 "Urori i stralltë", poezi, Shoqata e shkrimtarëve –Kastriot, 2012
 "Po të mos ishte fjala", Poezi, Shoqata e shkrimtarëve- Kastriot, 2012
 "Thyerja e urave", poezi, Shoqata e shkrimtarëve –Kastriot, 2012
 "Trokëllimat në gjumin e dallgëve", Poezi, Shoqata e Shkrimtarëve- Kastriot, 2012
 "Në flokët e dëborës", poezi, Shoqata e Shkrimtarëve –Kastriot, 2012
 "Një grusht nostalgji", Poezi, Shoqata e Shkrimtarëve-Kastriot, 2012
 "Kur filluan të flasin njerëzit", poezi, Shoqata e shkrimtarëve- Kastriot, 2012
 "Kur stinët kapërcejnë fshehurazi", poezi, Shoqata e Shkrimtarëve – Kastriot, 2012
 " Lisi në rrënjët e veta", Poezi, Shoqata e Shkrimtarëve –Kastriot 2012
 "Eca ecëm dhe do ecim", Poezi, Shoqata e Shkrimtarëve – Kastriot, 2012
 "Fëmijët e erës", Poezi, Shoqata e shkrimtarëve-Kastriot 2012
 "Çast në fund të stinës", Poezi, Shoqata e Shkrimtarëve- Kastriot-2012
 "Si të flas me drurët", Poezi, Shoqata e Shkrimtarëve-Kastriot, 2012
 "Më pëlqejnë mendimet e tua", Poezi, Shoqata e Shkrimtarëve- Kastriot, 2012
 "Andej dhe këndej kohës", poezi, Shoqata e Shkrimtarëve- Kastriot, 2012
 "Zëri i heshtjes", poezi, Shoqata e Shkrimtarëve- Kastriot, 2012
 "Kush i lexoi letrat prej erës", poezi, Shoqata e Shkrimtarëve-Kastriot, 2012
 "Fluturimi i korbave në netët pa hënë", prozë poetike, Shoqata e Shkrimtarëve –Kastriot, 2012
 "Koha e ime dhe koha e jote", Poezi, Shoqata e Shkrimtarëve-Kastriot, 2012
 "Diku te një baladë", Poezi, Shoqate e Shkrimtarëve –Kastriot, 2012
 "Sonte çdo gjë po i përngjan lotëve",Poezi, Shoqata e Shkrimtarëve –Kastriot, 2012
 "Ky def prej hëne", Poezi, Shoqata e Shkrimtarëve-Kastriot, 2012
 "Pyesni zogjtë në ikje ",Poezi, Shtëpia botuese "Fahri Fazliu"- Kastriot 2013
 "Fërfërimë gjethesh", Poezi, Shtëpia botuese "Fahri Fazliu", Kastriot- 2013
 "Refrene yjesh", Poezi, Shtëpia botuese "Fahri Fazliu"- Kastriot, 2013
 "Te delta e mjellmave", Poezi, Shtëpia botuese "Fahri Fazliu", Kastriot- 2013
 "Rinjohja", Poezi, Shoqata e Shkrimtarëve "Fahri Fazliu"- Kastriot, 2013
 "Diku në fund të një fillimi", Poezi, Shoqata e Shkrimtarëve, "Fahri Fazliu"- Kastriot, 2013
 "Makthi i hijes", Poezi, Shoqata e Shkrimtarëve-" Fahri Fazliu"Kastriot, 2013
 "Një zog prej uji", Poezi, Shoqata e Shkrimtarëve "Fahri Fazliu"- Kastriot
 "Druri i pikëlluar", Poezi,Shoqata e Shkrimtarëve "Fahri Fazliu"- Kastriot, 2014
 "Asnjë fjalë nuk frymon", Poezi,Shoqata e Shkrimtarëve "Fahri Fazliu"- Kastriot, 2014
 "Lëreni zërin tim", Poezi,Shoqata e Shkrimtarëve "Fahri Fazliu"- Kastriot, 2014
 "Mbi flokët e ullukëve", Poezi,Shoqata e Shkrimtarëve "Fahri Fazliu"- Kastriot, 2014
 "Sytë e gurtë të erës", Poezi,Shoqata e Shkrimtarëve "Fahri Fazliu"- Kastriot, 2014
 "Zjarri i mallit tim", Poezi,Shoqata e Shkrimtarëve "Fahri Fazliu"- Kastriot, 2014
 "Dëneste bashkë me erën", Poezi,Shoqata e Shkrimtarëve "Fahri Fazliu"- Kastriot, 2014
 "Atdheu i paçmuar", Poezi,Shoqata e Shkrimtarëve "Fahri Fazliu"- Kastriot, 2014
 "Nëpër gjymtyrët e mjegullave", Poezi,Shoqata e Shkrimtarëve "Fahri Fazliu"- Kastriot, 2014
 "Kur era teshtin", Poezi,Shoqata e Shkrimtarëve "Fahri Fazliu"- Kastriot, 2014
 "Ndjekësit e enigmave", Poezi,Shoqata e Shkrimtarëve "Fahri Fazliu"- Kastriot, 2014
 "Një grusht dashuri", Poezi,Shoqata e Shkrimtarëve "Fahri Fazliu"- Kastriot, 2014
 "Kur dehen perënditë", Poezi,Shoqata e Shkrimtarëve "Fahri Fazliu"- Kastriot, 2014
 "Daullet e një nate", Poezi,Shoqata e Shkrimtarëve "Fahri Fazliu"- Kastriot, 2014
 "Stina asnjanëse", Poezi, Shoqata e Shkrimtarëve "Fahri Fazliu"- Kastriot, 2014
 "Shi në qytetin tim", Poezi, Shoqata e Shkrimtarëve "Fahri Fazliu"- Kastriot, 2014
 "Psalm i harruar", Poezi, Shoqata e Shkrimtarëve "Fahri Fazliu"- Kastriot, 2014
 "Krakëllimat e natës", Poezi, Shoqata e Shkrimtarëve "Fahri Fazliu"- Kastriot, 2014
 "Menatë vijnë lejlekët", Poezi, Shoqata e Shkrimtarëve "Fahri Fazliu"- Kastriot, 2014
 "Fjetëm njëqind shekuj", Poezi, Shoqata e Shkrimtarëve "Fahri Fazliu"- Kastriot, 2014
 "Loti i gotës së dehur", Poezi, Shoqata e Shkrimtarëve "Fahri Fazliu"- Kastriot, 2014
 "Për kë po bie moj kambanë", Poezi, Shoqata e Shkrimtarëve "Fahri Fazliu"- Kastriot, 2014
 "Si trenat e verbër", Poezi, Shoqata e Shkrimtarëve "Fahri Fazliu"- Kastriot, 2014
 "Mbi shpirtin e erës pagane", Shoqata e Shkrimtarëve "Fahri Fazliu"- Kastriot, 2014
 "Ajo nuk erdhi sonte" Poezi, Shtëpia Botuese "TREND"- Prishtinë, 2015
 "Një hënë e zhveshur",Poezi, Shtëpia Botuese "TREND"– Prishtinë, 2015
 "Nëpër plasaritjet e mureve",Poezi, Shtëpia Botuese "TREND"– Prishtinë, 2015
 "Mes telave gjembor ",Poezi, Shtëpia Botuese "TREND" – Prishtinë, 2015
 "Të  vizatosh një zog në mur",Poezi, Shtëpia Botuese "TREND" – Prishtinë, 2015
 "Nuk flenë as kuajt e dehur" Poezi,  Shtëpia Botuese "TREND" – Prishtinë, 2015
 "Fluturojnë zogjtë e verbër  " Poezi, Shtëpia Botuese "TREND" – Prishtinë, 2015
 "Një shi prej bryme" , Poezi, Shtëpia Botuese "TREND" – Prishtinë, 2015
 "Në prehrin e pemëve" Poezi,Shtëpia Botuese "TREND" – Prishtinë, 2015
 "Zëri i largeët i shiut " , Poezi Shtëpia Botuese "TREND" – Prishtinë, 2015
 "Yjet e ngrira të kujtesës " , Poezi, Shtëpia Botuese "TREND" – Prishtinë, 2015
 "Thirrmat e hijeve" , Poezi, Shtëpia Botuese"TREND" – Prishtinë, 2015
 "Dritaret e verbëta " , Poezi, Shtëpia Botuese"TREND" – Prishtinë, 2015
 "Përtej portave të mbyllura" , Poezi, Shtëpia Botuese "TREND", Prishtinë, 2015
 "Malli i etjes" Poezi, Shtëpia Botuese "TREND", Prishtinë, 2016
 "Kur qajnë pemët  ", Poezi, Shtëpia Botuese "TREND", Prishtinë, 2016
 "Të dielave në qytetin tim ", Poezi, Shtëpia Botuese "TREND", Prishtinë, 2016 
 " Nëpër brigjet e kujtesës" Poezi, Shtëpia Botuese "TREND", Prishtinë, 2016 
 "Rrugës qante një stërqok",  Poezi, Shtëpia Botuese "TREND", Prishtinë, 2016 
 "Kali im prej bore" ,  Poezi, Shtëpia Botuese "TREND", Prishtinë, 2016 
 "Përballë hijes së mollës ",  Poezi, Shtëpia Botuese "TREND ", Prishtinë, 2016 
 "Jehu i zërave",  Poezi, Shtëpia Botuese "TREND", Prishtinë, 2016 
 "Në kujtesën e pemëve ",  Poezi, Shtëpia Botuese "TREND ", Prishtinë, 2016 
 "Më mirë një gjysmë ëndrre ", Poezi, Shtëpia Botuese "TREND ", Prishtinë, 2016 
 "Një dry prej dylli " Poezi, Shtëpia Botuese "TREND", Prishtinë, 2016. 
 " Në anën tjetër të mendjes",  Poezi, Shtëpia Botuese "TREND", Prishtinë, 2016 
 "Sa shumë ethe pat dimri sivjet",  Poezi, Shtëpia Botuese "TREND", Prishtinë, 2016 
 "Enigmat e kashelashave ", Poezi, Shtëpia Botuese "TREND", Prishtinë, 2016 
 "Nuk i them unë dot kësaj liri" , Poezi, Shtëpia Botuese "TREND", Prishtinë, 2016 
 "Fluturat prej letre ", Poezi, Shtëpia Botuese "TREND", Prishtinë, 2016 
 "Fluturimi i gjinkallës", Poezi, Shtëpia Botuese "TREND", Prishtinë, 2016 
 "Kumritë prej deltine", Poezi, Shtëpia Botuese "TREND", Prishtinë. 2016
 "Më pritni te baladat e gurit", poezi, Shtëpia Botuese "TREND", Prishtinë, 2017. 
 "Trenat këtu gjithmonë vonohen", Poezi, Shtëpia Botuese "TREND", Prishtinë. 2017
 "Lulëzojnë gjethet e ullinjve", poezi, Shtëpia Botuese "TREND", Prishtinë, 2017
 "Teatri antik i kujtesës", Poezi, Shtëpia Botuese "TREND", Prishtinë. 2017
 "Portreti i lirisë", poezi, Shtëpia Botuese TREND", Prishtinë, 2017
 "Një stinë delikate", poezi, Shtëpia Botuese TREND", Prishtinë, 2017
 "Te ullishtat e vjetra ", Poezi, Shtëpia Botuese "TREND", Prishtinë. 2017
 "Ishim të lumtur si gjinkallat", poezi, Shtëpia Botuese TREND", Prishtinë, 2017
 "Pikëllimet e rrënjëve", Poezi, Shtëpia Botuese "TREND", Prishtinë. 2017
 "Telat e shirave " poezi, Shtëpia Botuese TREND", Prishtinë, 2017
 "Një stuhi prej bryme", Poezi, Shtëpia Botuese "TREND", Prishtinë, 2018
 "Sonte s'ka dashuri " poezi, Shtëpia Botuese TREND", Prishtinë, 2018
 "I shëmbëllente pluhurit kozmik", Poezi, Shtëpia Botuese "TREND", Prishtinë, 2018
 "Llamburite atdheu i plagosur" poezi, Shtëpia Botuese TREND", Prishtinë, 2018
 "Gurët e pjekur shtatë herë" poezi, Shtëpia Botuese TREND", Prishtinë, 2018
 "Kur të dalë nga kjo stinë" poezi, Shtëpia Botuese TREND", Prishtinë, 2018
 "Ishin thyer te gjitha urat " poezi, Shtëpia Botuese TREND", Prishtinë, 2018
 "Gjethi i këputur në vjeshtë " poezi, Shtëpia Botuese TREND", Prishtinë, 2018
 "Ti mundesh nëse do" poezi, Shtëpia Botuese TREND", Prishtinë, 2018
 "Pëllumbat prej rrufeve", poezi, Shtëpia Botuese TREND", Prishtinë, 2018
 "Diku në zbrazëtinë e ndërgjegjes", poezi, Shtëpia Botuese TREND", Prishtinë, 2018
 "Retë e dendura të kujtesës ", poezi, Shtëpia Botuese TREND", Prishtinë, 2018
 "Pak diell e shumë acar", poezi, Shtëpia Botuese TREND", Prishtinë, 2019
 "Kur kyçen yjet e harresës ", poezi, Shtëpia Botuese TREND", Prishtinë, 2019
 "Nga pragjet e shtëpive", poezi, Shtëpia Botuese TREND", Prishtinë, 2019
 "Fluturat e djegura ", poezi, Shtëpia Botuese TREND", Prishtinë, 2019
 "Përtej asaj peme", poezi,Shtëpia Botuese TREND", Prishtinë, 2019
 " Kuajt e mjegullave", poezi, Shtëpia Botuese TREND", Prishtinë, 2019
 "Po të ishte ndryshe ", poezi,Shtëpia Botuese TREND", Prishtinë, 2019
 "Kur kthehen zogjtë e shiut ", poezi, Shtëpia Botuese TREND", Prishtinë, 2019
 "Mes gishtave të hijes", poezi,Shtëpia Botuese TREND", Prishtinë, 2019
 "kush i theu xhamat e shiut", poezi,Shtëpia Botuese TREND", Prishtinë, 2019
 "Poemat e dhembjekrenarisë ", poezi,Shtëpia Botuese TREND", Prishtinë, 2019
 "Marsi i çmendur në dy kohës", poezi, Shtëpia Botuese TREND", Prishtinë, 2019
 "Kur dënesin varret", poezi, Shtëpia Botuese TREND", Prishtinë, 2019
 "Mos më uroni udhë të mbarë", poezi, Shtëpia Botuese TREND", Prishtinë
 “Nuk mjafton të kesh vetëm emër  ”, poezi,Shtëpia Botuese TREND”, Prishtinë,2020
 “Portat e mbyllura me dyllë  ”, poezi, Shtëpia Botuese TREND”, Prishtinë,2o2o
 “Deri në baladën tjetër  ”, poezi, Shtëpia Botuese TREND”, Prishtinë,2020
 “Bletët e kaltërta”, poezi, Shtëpia Botuese TREND”, Prishtinë,202o
 “ Nën vezullime yjesh ”, poezi, Shtëpia Botuese TREND”, Prishtinë,2020
 “Duart e zhagmitura   ”, poezi, Shtëpia Botuese TREND”, Prishtinë,2020
 “Përshpëritja e mureve ”, poezi, Shtëpia Botuese TREND”, Prishtinë,2020
 “Atdheu im i dhembjeve  ”, poezi, Shtëpia Botuese TREND”, Prishtinë,2020
 “Vazoja me një pallto gri  ”, poezi, Shtëpia Botuese TREND”, Prishtinë,2020
 “Një hingëllimë si një gjëmë ”, poezi, Shtëpia Botuese TREND”, Prishtinë,2020
 “Çfarë bëra për ty atdhe”, poezi, Shtëpia Botuese TREND”, Prishtinë,2020
 “Te një stinë e harruar”, poezi, Shtëpia Botuese Prishtinë,2020
 “Më kanë folur muranat ”, poezi, Shtëpia Botuese TREND”, Prishtinë,2020
 “Matanë urave të thyera”, poezi, Shtëpia Botuese TREND”, Prishtinë,2020
 “Trenat e egër pa stacion  ”, poezi, Shtëpia Botuese TREND”, Prishtinë,2020
 “Poemat e dhembjekrenarisë -2”, poezi, Shtëpia Botuese TREND”, Prishtinë,2020
 “Të jetosh pa ëndrra  ”, poezi, Shtëpia Botuese TREND”, Prishtinë,2020
 “Portretet e ngujuara ”, poezi, Shtëpia Botuese TREND”, Prishtinë,2020
 “Ishte dikur një gur në lagje”, poezi, Shtëpia Botuese TREND”, Prishtinë,2020
 “Trazimi i brendshëm”, poezi, Shtëpia Botuese TREND, Prishtinë, 2020
 “Zgjimi i dhembjeve të fjetura”, poezi,Shtëpia Botuese TREND, Prishtinë, 2020
 “Një dorë prej mjegulle”, poezi, Shtëpia Botuese TREND, Prishtinë, 2020
 “Mbetëm sërish në fillim ”, poezi, Shtëpia Botuese TREND, Prishtinë, 2020

References 

1943 births
2020 deaths
Kosovan poets
People from Prizren